Gautam Buddha Nagar Lok Sabha constituency is one of the 80 Lok Sabha (parliamentary) constituencies in Uttar Pradesh state in northern India. This constituency, spread over Bulandshahr and Gautam Buddha Nagar districts came into existence in 2008 as a part of the implementation of delimitation of parliamentary constituencies based on the recommendations of the Delimitation Commission of India constituted in 2002.

Assembly segments
Presently, Gautam Buddh Nagar (G. B. Nagar) Lok Sabha constituency comprises five Vidhan Sabha (legislative assembly) segments. Noida, Jewar & Dadri fall under G. B. Nagar district, whereas Sikandrabad and Khurja fall under Bulandshahr district.

Members of the Parliament

Election results

2019 Results

2014 results

2009 results

See also
 Gautam Buddh Nagar district
 List of Constituencies of the Lok Sabha

Notes

External links
Gautam Buddha Nagar lok sabha  constituency election 2019 result details
Gautam Buddha Nagar lok sabha  constituency election 2019 date and schedule

Lok Sabha constituencies in Uttar Pradesh
Gautam Buddh Nagar district